The 2009–10  Nigeria Premier League was the 39th season of the competition since its inception. Starting on 20 September 2009, it ran to July 7 due to breaks for both the 2010 Africa Cup of Nations and the 2010 FIFA World Cup and a total of 378 of a possible 380 games played.
It ran without a sponsor since January due to the pulling out of sponsor Globacom.

Table

References

External links
 RSSSF
 NFF commends Globacom as contract expires

Nigeria Professional Football League seasons
Nigeria
1